Llanarth is both a small village and a community in Ceredigion, Wales. The community includes the village of Synod Inn.

Church
The parish church of St David's, once dedicated to St Fylltyg, is a Grade II* listed building. It was renovated in 1872. A stone in the churchyard is sometimes pointed out as bearing the Devil's footprint. According to legend, he was trying to steal one of the church's bells one night but woke the vicar, who drove him off. He left the footprint as he fled.

Amenities
Llanarth has a petrol station, post office, a primary school, a public house, a butcher, a convenience store and a garden centre.

Notable residents
 John Evans (died 1779), born at Meini Gwynion, curate of Portsmouth.
 Daniel Lewis Lloyd (1843–1899), schoolteacher and cleric, Bishop of Bangor, buried in Llanarth.
 Dafydd Jones (born 1979), Welsh rugby international and Llanelli Scarlets player was brought up in Llanarth.

References

External links

History of Llanarth
geograph.co.uk, photos of Llanarth and surrounding area

Villages in Ceredigion
Communities in Ceredigion